The 1989–90 NBA season was the Nuggets' 14th season in the National Basketball Association, and 23rd season as a franchise. The Nuggets got off to a fast start winning 11 of their first 15 games, on their way to a solid 19–9 start, and holding a 26–20 record at the All-Star break. At midseason, the team acquired Joe Barry Carroll from the New Jersey Nets. However, they began to show their age as they barely made the playoffs with a mediocre record of 43–39, fourth in the Midwest Division.

Fat Lever averaged 18.3 points, 9.3 rebounds, 6.5 assists and 2.1 steals per game, and was selected for the 1990 NBA All-Star Game, while Alex English averaged 17.9 points per game, and sixth man Walter Davis provided the team with 17.5 points per game off the bench. In addition, Michael Adams contributed 15.5 points, 6.3 assists and 1.5 steals per game, while Blair Rasmussen provided with 12.4 points, 7.3 rebounds and 1.3 blocks per game, and Danny Schayes averaged 10.4 points and 6.5 rebounds per game.

In the Western Conference First Round of the playoffs, the Nuggets were swept by the San Antonio Spurs in three straight games. Following the season, an era would come to an end in Denver as head coach Doug Moe was fired, while English signed as a free agent with the Dallas Mavericks, Lever was traded to the Mavericks, Schayes signed with the Milwaukee Bucks, and Barry Carroll was released to free agency.

Draft picks

Roster

Regular season

Season standings

z - clinched division title
y - clinched division title
x - clinched playoff spot

Record vs. opponents

Game log

Playoffs

|- align="center" bgcolor="#ffcccc"
| 1
| April 26
| @ San Antonio
| L 103–119
| Todd Lichti (22)
| Todd Lichti (13)
| Lichti, Adams (8)
| HemisFair Arena15,910
| 0–1
|- align="center" bgcolor="#ffcccc"
| 2
| April 28
| @ San Antonio
| L 120–129
| Fat Lever (26)
| Fat Lever (16)
| Fat Lever (9)
| HemisFair Arena15,910
| 0–2
|- align="center" bgcolor="#ffcccc"
| 3
| May 1
| San Antonio
| L 120–131
| Alex English (24)
| Lever, Rasmussen (10)
| Fat Lever (8)
| McNichols Sports Arena15,604
| 0–3
|-

Player statistics

Season

Playoffs

Awards and records

Transactions

References

See also
 1989-90 NBA season

Denver Nuggets seasons
1989 in sports in Colorado
1990 in sports in Colorado
Denver